Hannah Botterman (born 8 June 1999) is an English rugby union prop who represents Saracens Women in club rugby and the England national team. Botterman made her debut in 2017 against Canada.

International career 
In 2017, Botterman was called up to the England national women's rugby team after an impressive season at her club, Saracens. She made her debut versus Canada.

Botterman played again for England in the 2019 Super Series San Diego and was awarded a full time professional contract by the Rugby Football Union for the 2019/20 season.

She was part of the Grand Slam winning 2019 Women's Six Nations Championship team.

She was named in the England squad for the delayed 2021 Rugby World Cup held in New Zealand in October and November 2022.

Club career 
Aged 18 she made her debut for Saracens Women during the 2017/18 season. She has been instrumental in Saracens winning back-to-back Tyrell Premier 15s titles, scoring the winning try in the 2017/18 final against Harlequins Women.

She has represented Hertfordshire, London & South East and England Under-18s.

Early life and education 
Botterman began playing rugby aged four for Datchworth RFC and after eight years she move to Welwyn RFC.

Both her parents were involved in the game playing for Datchworth, as were other members of her extended family: her aunt, Jane Everett, was also an England international prop. Her uncle, Greg Botterman, played for England and Saracens.

She was educated at Monk’s Walk School in Welwyn Garden City, Hertfordshire. At 16 she attended prestigious rugby school Hartpury College.

Before she was offered a full-time rugby contract, Botterman was a painter and decorator, as well as a waitress at Harvester. She also plays golf recreationally.

References

External links
 RFU Player Profile

1999 births
Living people
England women's international rugby union players
LGBT rugby union players
English female rugby union players
Rugby union props
Saracens Women rugby players
21st-century English women